The 2017 NCAA Division I Football Championship Game was a postseason college football game that determined a national champion in the NCAA Division I Football Championship Subdivision for the 2016 season. It was played at Toyota Stadium in Frisco, Texas, on January 7, 2017, with kickoff at 12:00 noon EST, and was the culminating game of the 2016 FCS Playoffs. With sponsorship from Northwestern Mutual, the game was officially known as the NCAA FCS Football Championship Presented by Northwestern Mutual.

Teams
The participants of the 2017 NCAA Division I Football Championship Game were the finalists of the 2016 FCS Playoffs, which began with a 24-team bracket. No. 4 seed James Madison and unseeded Youngstown State qualified for the final by winning their semifinal games. James Madison was the designated home team for the final game.

Youngstown State Penguins

Youngstown State finished their regular season with an 8–3 record (6–2 in conference). In the FCS playoffs, they defeated Samford, Jacksonville State, Wofford, and second-seeded Eastern Washington to reach the finals. The Penguins entered the championship game with a 4–2 record in prior FCS/Division I-AA finals, contested during the 1991 through 1999 seasons.

James Madison Dukes

James Madison finished their regular season with a 10–1 record (8–0 in conference). Their only loss was to North Carolina of the FBS, 56–28. In the FCS playoffs, they defeated New Hampshire, Sam Houston State, and top-seeded North Dakota State to reach the finals. The Dukes entered the championship game with a 1–0 record in prior FCS/Division I-AA finals, having defeated Montana for the 2004 season title.

Game summary

Scoring summary

Game statistics

Notes

References

External links
Box score at ESPN
January 7, 2017 - Youngstown St. vs. James Madison via YouTube

Championship Game
NCAA Division I Football Championship Games
James Madison Dukes football games
Youngstown State Penguins football games
American football in the Dallas–Fort Worth metroplex
Sports in Frisco, Texas
NCAA Division I Football Championship Game
NCAA Division I Football Championship Game